Yên Thành is a rural district of Nghệ An province, in the North Central Coast region of Vietnam. As of 2019, the district had a population of 302,500. The district covers an area of 549 km². The district capital lies at Yên Thành.

Geography
Yên Thành has both mountains and plains. It is bordered by Tân Kỳ, Quỳnh Lưu and Diễn Châu districts to the north, Diễn Châu District to the east, Nghi Lộc District to the southeast, Đô Lương District to the south, and Tân Kỳ District to the west.

The administrative unit
Yên Thành district has 39 administrative units, including Yên Thành commune:

Transportation
Highway 7A: 18 km from Vinh Thanh My Thanh commune to Provincial Road 534 (Highway 7A connected to National Highway 1A ): 14 km from the town of Yen Thanh Son Thanh Provincial Road 538 (Highway 7A connected with National Highway 1A): 15 km from commune to commune Hop Thanh Cong Thanh.

References

Districts of Nghệ An province